Oren Rudavsky (born c. 1957) is an American documentary filmmaker specializing in work about individuals and communities outside the mainstream.  He graduated from Oberlin College in 1979. Oren Rudavsky is the recipient of a Guggenheim Fellowship. Rudavsky is currently producing the NEH funded American Masters documentary: Joseph Pulitzer: Voice of the People.  He is also working on a documentary for a program called Witness Theater, which will chronicle the relationships formed between high school students and Holocaust survivors, culminating with a dramatization of the lives of the survivors.  His films Colliding Dreams co-directed with Joseph Dorman, and The Ruins of Lifta co-directed with Menachem Daum, were released theatrically in 2016.

His film A Life Apart: Hasidism in America was short-listed for the Academy Awards and his film Hiding and Seeking was nominated for an Independent Spirit award. Both were co-directed with Menachem Daum. Rudavsky was the producer of media for the permanent installations at the Russian Jewish Museum and Tolerance Center in Moscow which opened in 2013. In 2011, Rudavsky produced a series of profile documentaries for Bloomberg television called Risk Takers. In 2009 Rudavsky was Producer/Writer of the two part series Time for School 3, a twelve-year longitudinal study examining the education of seven children in the developing world for the PBS series Wide Angle. In 2006, he completed his first fiction feature as Producer/Writer/Director: The Treatment, starring Chris Eigeman, Ian Holm and Famke Janssen. The film premiered at the 2006 Tribeca Film Festival where it was awarded Best Film, Made in New York.

Rudavsky’s other work includes writing and producing segments for the ABC national
series PrimeTime Live, the PBS series Media Matters, Religion and Ethics Newsweekly
and other national programming. He has also worked as a post-production supervisor
on the film unit of Saturday Night Live and the syndicated series Tales From the
Darkside in the 1980s.

Filmography

As director 
 At the Crossroads: Jewish Life in Eastern Europe Today 1988
 Dreams So Real, an animated film about three mentally ill men who created their own films, won first prize at the New England Film Festival in 1981.
 A Film About My Home, an autobiographical film 1981
 Gloria: A Case Of Alleged Police Brutality.  1983
 Ritual, a documentary about Jewish ritual incorporating scholarly commentary with portraits of individuals 1990
 Saying Kaddish, which was nominated for an Emmy Award in Directing 1992
 Spark Among the Ashes: A Bar Mitzvah in Poland took second prize at the Chicago International Film Festival and a Blue Ribbon at the American Film Festival and was included in the Sundance Film Festival. 1986
 Theater of the Palms: The World of Puppet Master Lee Tien Lu 1989
 A Life Apart in collaboration with Menachem Daum was shortlisted for an Academy Award and was nominated for an emmy. PBS 1994
 Hiding and Seeking in collaboration with Menachem Daum PBS POV 1997
 The Treatment Best Film Made in New York, Tribeca Film Festival, 2006
 "''Time for School" 2003, 2006, Produced by Judy Katz 2009, in collaboration with Tamara Rosenberg PBS, 2016
 "To Educate a Girl" 2011 in collaboration with Fred Rendina
 "Michael Burry" 2012 Bloomberg TV
 "Michelle Rhee" 2012 Bloomberg TV
 "Colliding Dreams" aka  "The Zionist  Idea" 2016 in collaboration with Joseph Dorman
 "The Ruins of Lifta" in collaboration with Menachem Daum 2016
 "Joseph Pulitzer" 2018
 "Witness Theater" 2018

As Director of Photography 
 The Amish: Not to be Modern
 "Spark Among the Ashes"
 "Theater of the Palms"
 The Last Klezmer
 Twitch and Shout, a film about Tourette’s syndrome
 A Life Apart: Hasidism in America
 "Colliding Dreams"
 "The Ruins of Lifta"

References 
 Resume on PBS web site
 Article on Rudavsky in Oberlin paper

External links 
 The Director Interviews: Oren Rudavsky, The Treatment at Filmmaker Magazine
 collidingdreamsthemovie.com
 ruinsoflifta.com

1950s births
Living people
American documentary filmmakers
Oberlin College alumni
Place of birth missing (living people)